Derbyshire County Cricket Club in 1889 was the cricket season when the English club  Derbyshire had been playing  nineteen years. Derbyshire's matches were not considered to be first class in this season. The club had lost first class status after 1887 and did not regain it until 1894, the year before they joined the County Championship. However many of the players competed for the club earlier or subsequently at first-class level.

1889 season

Derbyshire played eleven games, all against sides that they had played in first class matches before 1888 or that joined the County Championship four years later. William Chatterton was in his third year as captain and was also  top scorer making a century against Essex. George Davidson topped the bowling with 38 wickets.

Fred Spofforth, known as the "Demon Bowler" had toured England with the Australians in 1886, and afterwards chose to live in Derbyshire. The club  tried to persuade the County Cricket Council to let him play for Derbyshire without waiting for the usual two years' residential qualification. Although the application was refused, in 1889 Yorkshire generously offered to waive the point so that Spofforth could play against them.  He did so in two matches in the 1889 season, repaying them in one game by taking fifteen of their wickets for 81 runs. In the 1890 season, with the residential qualification met, Spofforth was able not only to play for Derbyshire but to captain the side. Charles Evans who made his debut  played on for Derbyshire into the  County Championship in 1895. Frank Evershed one of the Evershed brothers and a rugby international played in his first season for Derbyshire, but never played a first class game. Joseph Burrows, George Maltby and Thomas Purdy all played in one career match for Derbyshire against the MCC and only Purdy returned the following year.

Matches

{| class="wikitable" width="100%"
! bgcolor="#efefef" colspan=6 | List of  matches
|- bgcolor="#efefef"
!No.
!Date
!V
!Result 
!Margin
!Notes
|- 
|1
 | 20 May 1889
| MCC     Lord's Cricket Ground, St John's Wood 
|bgcolor="#00FF00"|Won
| 1 wicket
| Hearne 6–16; West 6-29 
|- 
|2
|10 Jun 1889
| Yorkshire County Ground, Derby  
|bgcolor="#FF0000"|Lost
| 54 runs
| FR Spofforth 7-45 and 8-36; Peel 6-24 and 8-43 
|- 
|3
|17 Jun 1889
| Essex   County Ground, Leyton 
|bgcolor="#FFCC00"|Drawn
|
| W Chatterton 168; G Davidson 129; Burrell 5-56 
|- 
|4
|20 Jun 1889
|  Surrey Kennington Oval 
|bgcolor="#FF0000"|Lost
| Innings and 223 runs
| W Read  103;  G Lohmann  5-42; T Bowley 6-48 
|- 
|5
|  24 Jun 1889
| LeicestershireCounty Ground, Derby 
|bgcolor="#00FF00"|Won
| Innings and 133 runs
| W Sugg  104; A Rylott 5–125; G Davidson 6-49 
|- 
|6
|01 Jul 1889
| Nottinghamshire    Trent Bridge, Nottingham 
|bgcolor="#FF0000"|Lost
| 10 wickets
| Richardson 5-54; W Attewell 5-26 
|- 
|7
|22 Jul 1889
|  Surrey  County Ground, Derby  
|bgcolor="#FF0000"|Lost
| 48 runs
| Beaumont 8-53; T Bowley 6-13 
|- 
|8
|29 Jul 1889
| Nottinghamshire   County Ground, Derby 
|bgcolor="#FF0000"|Lost
| Innings and 26 runs
| W Attewell  6-35 and 5-24; Richardson 6-36 
|- 
|9
|05 Aug 1889
| Yorkshire   Bramall Lane, Sheffield  
|bgcolor="#FFCC00"|Drawn
|
|  
|- 
|10
|08 Aug 1889
| Leicestershire  Grace Road, Leicester 
|bgcolor="#FFCC00"|Drawn
|
| G Davidson 6-47; J J Hulme  5-28 
|- 
|11
| 19 Aug 1889
| Essex   County Ground, Derby 
|bgcolor="#00FF00"|Won
| 10 wickets
| Bishop 5-77; W Sugg  7-44 
|-

Statistics

Batting averages

Bowling averages

Wicket Keeper

 James Disney  Catches 11,  Stumping 4

See also
Derbyshire County Cricket Club seasons
1889 English cricket season

References

1889 in English cricket
Derbyshire County Cricket Club seasons
English cricket seasons in the 19th century